Florence Eliza Lord (1879–1942) was a journalist in Brisbane, Queensland, Australia. She is best known for her long-running series of articles on Brisbane's Historic Homes in The Queenslander newspaper. She sometimes published under the pseudonym of Wilga.

Early life
Florence Eliza Lord was born on 22 July 1879 in Cockatoo, Queensland, the daughter of William Lord, a grazier, and his wife Marianne (née McLean). After the death of her father in 1903, Florence and her mother relocated to Brisbane, where Florence worked as a governess and a lady's companion.

Journalism
During the 1920s and 1930s, Florence Lord published sketches and articles on history and travel in the Brisbane Courier (later The Courier-Mail) and The Queenslander newspapers.

Florence Lord was a member of the Royal Historical Society of Queensland, the Lyceum Club and the Queensland Town and Country Club. Being socially well-connected, she was able to gain access to many of Brisbane's finest homes to produce her newspaper series on Brisbane's Historical Homes.

Later life
In the late 1930s she retired to Melbourne and in 1937 was living in Collingwood.

Florence Lord died on 27 June 1942 at a private hospital in Camberwell, Victoria.

References

Further reading
  — full text available online

External links
  — online access to Florence Lord's Historic Houses series

Journalists from Queensland
1879 births
1942 deaths
20th-century Australian journalists
20th-century Australian women